Workin' on a Groovy Thing may refer to:
 "Workin' On a Groovy Thing" (song), a 1968 song written by Neil Sedaka
 Workin' on a Groovy Thing (Patti Drew album), 1968
 Workin' on a Groovy Thing (Neil Sedaka album), 1969
 Workin' on a Groovy Thing (Bola Sete album), 1970